Harvey F. Gee (1908-1984) was a member of the Wisconsin State Assembly.

Biography
Gee was born on February 29, 1908, in Wisconsin Rapids, Wisconsin. He graduated from Rollins College. During World War II, he served in the United States Army. He died on June 5, 1984 at Riverside Hospital in Wisconsin Rapids, Wisconsin after a long illness.

Political career
Gee was first elected to the Assembly in 1960. Additionally, he was a member of the Wood County, Wisconsin Board of Supervisors from 1938 to 1960. He was a Republican.

References

People from Wisconsin Rapids, Wisconsin
County supervisors in Wisconsin
Republican Party members of the Wisconsin State Assembly
Military personnel from Wisconsin
United States Army soldiers
United States Army personnel of World War II
Rollins College alumni
1908 births
1984 deaths
20th-century American politicians